The 1977 San Francisco 49ers season was the franchise's 28th season in the National Football League and their 32nd overall. Hoping to build on an 8–6 campaign one season ago, the team struggled and was again unable to qualify for the playoffs, this time posting a record of 5–9, including starting the season 0–5.

Offseason 
Before the season began, the team was purchased by Edward DeBartolo, Sr., who in turn gave management of the team to his son, Edward DeBartolo, Jr. The team also hired a new general manager, Joe Thomas, and a new head coach, Ken Meyer.

Personnel

Staff

Roster

Schedule

Game Summaries

Week 8
Television: CBS
Announcers: Gary Bender, Tom Matte
Stadium: Atlanta Fulton County Stadium in Atlanta, Georgia
Attendance: 46,577
San Francisco knocked Atlanta out of a tie for first in the NFC West, sacking Falcons quarterback Steve Bartkowski seven times for a loss of 76 yards. The only touchdown of a game came on a 2-yard run by Wilbur Jackson.

Week 9
Television: CBS
Announcers: Frank Glieber and Nick Buoniconti
Ray Wersching booted a 33-yard field goal in overtime to cap a second half San Francisco rally and give his team a comeback win over New Orleans. Wersching had a chance to end the game in regulation time when his 50-yard field goal was miss midway through the fourth quarter. The drive to a winning score covered 59 yards. Delvin Williams, who put the 49ers on the scoreboard with a 5-yard touchdown run in the third quarter, got 16 yards on the drive and finished the game with 110 yards on 25 carries. The Saints also missed a chance to win it in regulation when Rich Szaro's 30-yard field goal attempt hit the left goal post and bounced away.

Week 11
Television: CBS
Announcers: Tim Ryan, Tom Matte
This great game started when the Saints Rich Szaro kicked a 30-yard field goal. then the 49ers rallied back to even the game with a Ray Wersching field goal of 40 yards but back came those Saints as Clarence Chapman returned a kickoff 92 yards for a touchdown. In a game that has no playoff berths at stake but pride, the Saints added to their lead as Archie Manning scored from 1 yard out. But the 49ers cam back on the legs of Wilbur Jackson who ran for 190 yards on 16 carries before he left the game in the fourth quarter with a pulled hamstring. Jackson scored on touchdowns from 34 and 1. Then late in the game the 49ers drove on the legs of Delvin Williams. the 49ers chances to win was helped by a roughing the passing penalty against Mike Fultz of the Saints cancelling a Potential Saints interception. Giving new life Ray Wersching kicked a 42-yard field goal with no time left to give the 49ers a win.

Standings

References 

San Francisco 49ers seasons
San Francisco 49ers
1977 in San Francisco
San